Goodbye Darling (French: Adieu chérie) is a 1946 French drama film directed by Raymond Bernard and starring Danielle Darrieux, Louis Salou and Gabrielle Dorziat. The film's sets were designed by the art director Robert Gys.

Cast
 Danielle Darrieux as Chérie  
 Louis Salou as Maxime  
 Gabrielle Dorziat as Constance  
 Jacques Berthier as Bruno Betillac  
 Germaine Stainval 
 Rolande Forest    
 Palmyre Levasseur 
 Robert Seller 
 Pierre Sergeol 
 Edouard Hemme 
 Jacques Janvier 
 Pierre Larquey as Édouard  
 Jean-Jacques Delbo as Ricardo  
 Alice Tissot as Mademoiselle Chomelette  
 Charles Aznavour as Le duettiste  
 Robert de France 
 Marguerite de Morlaye
 René Fluet    
 Jean Gabert 
 Marie Guilhène   
 Johnny Marchand
 Marcel Roche

Production
Guy Lefranc was assistant director on the movie.

References

Bibliography 
 Rège, Philippe. Encyclopedia of French Film Directors, Volume 1. Scarecrow Press, 2009.

External links 
 

1946 films
1946 drama films
French drama films
1940s French-language films
Films directed by Raymond Bernard
French black-and-white films
1940s French films